Sainte-Croix is a municipality in and the seat of the Municipalité régionale de comté de Lotbinière in Quebec, Canada. It is part of the Chaudière-Appalaches region and the population is 2,433 as of 2009. The new constitution dates from 2001, after the amalgamation of the parish and the village of Sainte-Croix.

Name
Sainte-Croix name refers to the True Cross, but was in use well before its foundation in 1713. In fact, the seigneurie of Sainte-Croix was granted in 1637 to the Company of One Hundred Associates at a point named Platon Sainte-Croix (Holy Cross Flats in English), at the mouth of the Jacques-Cartier River. It had been named as such by Jacques Cartier, who had spent the winter of 1535-36 there. Samuel de Champlain explained in 1613 that there had been a mistake and this was not the place where Jacques Cartier had wintered. The point is now called Pointe Platon ("Plato (or Flat) Point").

Economy
South Shore Furniture is based in Sainte-Croix and has a factory in the municipality.

References

External links

Commission de toponymie du Québec
Ministère des Affaires municipales, des Régions et de l'Occupation du territoire

Municipalities in Quebec
Incorporated places in Chaudière-Appalaches
Lotbinière Regional County Municipality